Kenneth W. Mack (born December 14, 1964) is a historian and  the inaugural Lawrence D. Biele Professor of Law at Harvard Law School, where he has been a member of the faculty since 2000.  He is the author of Representing the Race: The Creation of the Civil Rights Lawyer (2012), and co-editor of The New Black: What Has Changed--and What Has Not--With Race  in America (2012).

Education and early career
Kenneth W. Mack grew up in Harrisburg, Pennsylvania, attended Harrisburg High School and graduated from Central Dauphin East High School in 1982.  He enrolled at Drexel University, where he received his B.S. in Electrical Engineering in 1987, and was inducted into the Tau Beta Pi engineering honor society.  He then worked as an electrical engineer for Bell Laboratories, where he did Integrated circuit design.

He left Bell Labs to enroll at Harvard Law School, where he earned a J.D.,  cum laude, in 1991.  He served as Executive Editor (Bluebook) of the Harvard Law Review, when his classmate, Barack Obama, served as its president. Mack clerked for the Honorable Robert L. Carter, in the United States District Court for the Southern District of New York.  After clerking, he worked in the Washington, D.C. office of Covington & Burling.  In 1994, Mack left the practice of law to enter graduate school at Princeton University, where he received a master's degree in 1996, and a Ph.D. in 2005, both in history.

Academic career
In 1999, Mack received an appointment as the Reginald F. Lewis Fellow at Harvard Law School.  The following year he joined the Harvard law faculty as a professor.  Mack's teaching and scholarship have focused on the legal and constitutional history of American race relations and economic life. He has written and lectured widely in these areas. His work has appeared in the Harvard Law Review, Yale Law Journal, Journal of American History, Law and History Review, and other scholarly outlets.  He has also written opinion pieces for TIME, the Washington Post, Boston Globe, The Root, Los Angeles Times, Baltimore Sun, and other popular media.  He has appeared on the PBS NewsHour and has been interviewed by a number of media outlets, including CNN, PBS Frontline, Anderson Cooper 360, The New Yorker, The New York Times, and The Los Angeles Times.  In 2007, he was awarded the Alphonse Fletcher Sr. Fellowship by the Fletcher Foundation.  In 2010, he was awarded an honorary Doctor of Public Service by Harrisburg University of Science and Technology.

Books
Representing the Race: The Creation of the Civil Rights Lawyer (2012)

The New Black: What Has Changed -- and What Has Not -- with Race in America (2012)

References

External links
Harvard Law faculty page
Personal Webpage

1964 births
Living people
African-American people
Harvard Law School faculty
Harvard Law School alumni
Writers from Harrisburg, Pennsylvania
Princeton University alumni
Historians of the United States
People associated with Covington & Burling